Administration Building, Missouri State Fruit Experiment Station, also known as the Old Administration Building, is a historic experiment station building located near Mountain Grove, Wright County, Missouri. It was designed by architect Henry H. Hohenschild and built in 1900. It is a -story, Tudor Revival style red brick building on a limestone block foundation. The building features a bellcast roof with pedimented gables, large scrolled brackets, and a squat round corner tower with a conical roof.

It was listed on the National Register of Historic Places in 1979.

See also

References

Office buildings on the National Register of Historic Places in Missouri
Tudor Revival architecture in Missouri
Government buildings completed in 1900
Buildings and structures in Wright County, Missouri
National Register of Historic Places in Wright County, Missouri